The Oliver Iron Mining Company was a mining company operating in Minnesota, United States.  It was one of the most prominent companies in the early decades of mining on the Mesabi Range.  As a division of U.S. Steel, Oliver dwarfed its competitors—in 1920, it operated 128 mines across the region, while its largest competitor operated only 65.

After the Merritt brothers began shipping iron ore from their Mountain Iron Mine in 1892, Henry W. Oliver, a Pittsburgh businessman, traveled to the Iron Range to consider investing in the fledgling industry. Impressed by what he saw, Oliver offered to purchase one of the ore deposits for $75,000 and 65 cents per ton of ore mined. The Merritts sold Oliver the deposit, and Oliver Iron Mining Company was born.

Many early mines on the Mesabi were controlled by East Coast financiers. John D. Rockefeller bought the Merritt brothers' holdings in February 1894. That April, Andrew Carnegie loaned Oliver $500,000 for half of Oliver's stock so he could compete with Rockefeller. Since Carnegie owned steel mills but Rockefeller didn't, Rockefeller had virtually no other options than to sell his ore to Carnegie. As a result, the three men reached a compromise in 1896: Oliver would mine the ore, Rockefeller's railroad system would transport the product, and Carnegie would transform it into steel. This agreement was finalized in 1901, and U.S. Steel (USS) was incorporated as the largest corporation in the world.

Oliver mines were originally clustered on the eastern end of the Mesabi. In 1900, however, investors Chester Adgate Congdon and Guilford G. Hartley acquired mineral leases on the western end of the Range near the town of Nashwauk. The ore in this area was sandier than the ore mined on the eastern end, so it needed processing in order to be used in a steel mill. This processing is called concentration because ore is concentrated into a higher-grade product. Because of the high costs associated with processing, the businessmen approached Oliver Iron Mining Company with an investment opportunity. In 1904, Oliver invested $10 million in a concentration plant that would serve this area, which the corporation referred to as the "Canisteo District". The plant, called the Trout Lake Concentrator, transformed the region, helping existing towns like Bovey and Calumet grow. In addition, the towns of Coleraine, Marble, and Taconite were directly built by Oliver to house workers in the newly developing region.

In 1907, miners organized themselves into labor unions because they felt that mining companies—including Oliver—weren't treating them fairly. A majority did not speak English and were therefore vulnerable to exploitation. When Oliver didn't respond to a list of union demands presented that July, nearly 16,000 miners launched the 1907 Mesabi Range strike. To continue operations, Oliver brought in new workers directly from Europe. When production recovered as a result, the strike collapsed and many miners returned to work—although some were blacklisted by the mining companies and never worked in a mine again. Nine years later miners protested once again with the 1916 Mesabi Range strike. This time, Oliver hired armed guards, and in June, a dispute between strikers and guards broke out in Virginia, Minnesota. A picketer, John Alar, was killed and subsequently became a martyr for the cause. As the strike continued into late July, Elizabeth Gurley Flynn—a well-known American labor organizer—spoke to strikers and encouraged them to persevere, but many soon returned to work in August, effectively ending the strike.

As natural ore reserves diminished due to increased production for the World War I effort, Oliver turned to ore that required more processing than the rich ore that he originally purchased from the Merritt brothers. While the Trout Lake Concentrator was still in operation in the Canisteo District, Oliver built the Pilotac and Extaca plants near the city of Virginia. Pilotac was built to research methods for concentrating taconite ore, and Extaca was built to agglomerate, or combine, taconite concentrate into a high-iron product that could be used in steel mills.
Millions of dollars were invested in taconite plants throughout the Iron Range, and taconite became the chief rock mined in the region. As the Iron Range transitioned to taconite mining, United States Steel dropped the Oliver name in place of Minnesota Ore Operations.

References

1892 establishments in Minnesota
Mining companies of the United States
Mining in Minnesota